The 1998/1999 season in Dutch football was the 43rd season in the Eredivisie, where Feyenoord Rotterdam claimed the title, for the first time since 1993. Ajax Amsterdam won the Dutch National Cup.

Johan Cruijff-schaal

Eredivisie

Champions League : Feyenoord Rotterdam and Willem II
Champions League qualification: PSV Eindhoven
UEFA Cup: Vitesse, Roda JC and Ajax (Cup Winners)
Promotion / relegation play-offs ("Nacompetitie"): RKC and Sparta
Relegated: NAC Breda

Topscorers

Awards

Dutch Footballer of the Year
 1998 – 1999 — Ruud van Nistelrooy (PSV Eindhoven)

Dutch Golden Shoe Winner
 1998 — Edwin van der Sar (Ajax Amsterdam)
 1999 — Michael Mols (FC Utrecht)

Feyenoord Winning Squad 1998-'99

Goal
 Jerzy Dudek
 Edwin Zoetebier

Defence
 Patrick Allotey
 Henk Fräser
 Ulrich van Gobbel
 Patricio Graff
 Christian Gyan
 Ferry de Haan
 Bert Konterman
 Fernando Picun

 Bernard Schuiteman
 Kees van Wonderen

Midfield
 Paul Bosvelt
 Jean-Paul van Gastel
 Igor Korneev
 Tininho
 Patrick Paauwe

Attack
 Julio Ricardo Cruz
 Bonaventure Kalou
 Robin Nelisse
 Jon Dahl Tomasson
 Pablo Sánchez
 Henk Vos
 Peter van Vossen

Management
 Leo Beenhakker (Coach)
 Geert Meijer (Assistant)
 John Metgod (Assistant)

Eerste Divisie

Promoted : FC Den Bosch
Promotion / relegation play-offs ("Nacompetitie"): FC Groningen, Emmen, Helmond Sport, Zwolle, Excelsior and Dordrecht '90

Topscorers

Promotion and relegation

Group A

Group B

Stayed : RKC Waalwijk and Sparta Rotterdam

KNVB Cup

Final

Dutch national team

References
 RSSSF Archive
 RDFC.com

 
Seasons in Dutch football
F
F